Kings Community School is an alternative high school located in Hanford, California.

References

External links
Kings Community School website

Educational institutions established in 1983
Public high schools in California
Public middle schools in California
Schools in Kings County, California
1983 establishments in California